David Carroll (October 15, 1913 – March 22, 2008) was an American studio arranger, conductor, and musical director.

Biography
Carroll was born in Taylorville, Illinois. He wrote and recorded many songs of his own, played by musicians such as Tiny Hill, Bobby Christian, Earl Backus, Paul Severson, Mike Simpson, Sarah Vaughan, Vic Damone and Patti Page. While Carroll was musical director at Mercury Records (1951 to early 1960s), Quincy Jones composed some songs for him.

In his later years, Carroll was associated with the Smothers Brothers. He at first traveled with them as their conductor. Later he became general music director and then general manager of the organization. In the latter post he managed television and movie appearances, recordings, publishing interests and personal appearances.

Carroll had two hit versions of "Melody of Love" in 1955, one, an instrumental (peaked at No. 8 on the Billboard Hot 100), the other featuring a narration by Paul Tremaine. He led many recording sessions in the 1950s and 1960s, either under his name or under 'David Carroll & His Orchestra.' Nearly all of these sessions were for Mercury Records. He is credited with writing the advertising jingle for American Family Insurance in 1965.

Carroll died in San Jose, California at the age of 94.

References

External links

1913 births
2008 deaths
American male conductors (music)
Musicians from Chicago
People from Taylorville, Illinois
Classical musicians from Illinois
20th-century American conductors (music)
20th-century American male musicians
Mercury Records artists